Bhelpuri is a savoury snack originating from India, and is also a type of chaat. It is made of puffed rice, vegetables and a tangy tamarind sauce, and has a crunchy texture.

Bhel is often identified as a 'beach snack', strongly associated with the beaches of Mumbai, such as Chowpatty or Juhu. One theory for its origin is that it was invented at a restaurant called Vithal near Victoria Terminus. According to another theory, bhelpuri was conceived by the city's Gujarati community, who made it by adding complex flavours to the simple North Indian chaat. Gujarati housewives began making it, and invented several varieties like the pakodi puri, and as it spread in popularity so many different communities made their own regional variations.

The original Mumbai recipe has spread to most parts of India, where it has been modified to suit local food availability. Dry bhel is made from bhadang, a spicy namkeen from Western Maharashtra, and is consumed after garnishing with onions, coriander and lemon juice. The Bengali variant of bhelpuri is called jhalmuri (meaning "spicy puffed rice"). A local Karnataka variant of bhelpuri is known as churumuri or churmuri.

Commonly used ingredients 

Bhelpuri is made from puffed rice and sev (a fried snack shaped like thin noodles made from besan flour) mixed with potatoes, onions, chat masala and chutney and a mixture of other fried snacks as the base of the snack.  Bhelpuri has a balance of sweet, salty, tart and spicy flavors, with different textures as well, including crispy and crunchy from the puffed rice and fried sev. Other commonly used ingredients include tomatoes and chilis added to the base. In northern India recipes also include boiled potatoes cut into small pieces.

See also 
 Chotpoti
 Phuchka
 Sev mamra
 Ghugni

References 

Indian snack foods
Jharkhandi cuisine
Indian fast food
Culture of Mumbai
Gujarati cuisine
Bengali cuisine
Street food